Murdostoun is an estate in North Lanarkshire, Scotland, which includes a castle (Ordnance Survey Grid Reference NS8257), which lies on the South Calder Water near the village of Bonkle in the parish of Shotts, North Lanarkshire, Scotland. The name Murdostoun was derived from the words Murthock and Toun which meant dwelling of Murthock. Murdostoun can refer to the ancient barony of the Scott and then the Inglis clan, the castle built by the Scotts or a bridge over the South Calder Water.

The Estate
The Murdostoun Estate contained many farms. The main ones were: Foulburn, Castlehill, Easthouse, Westhouse, Penty, Muimailing, Easterhill, Westerhill and Shapenknowe. Other near the Murdostoun Castle were Eastwood, Westwood, Rosebank and Heughbank. The estate was reported to consist of 1,760 acres in 1872. The former Allanton Estate lay just to the east.

Murdostoun Castle
Murdostoun Castle lies 1100 metres west-northwest of the village of Bonkle. Murdostoun Castle was built by the Scott family in the 15th century and was constructed as a keep or fortified residence.  It stands on a good position high above the South Calder Water and was one of many built as a defensive measure across the Forth and Clyde Valley.  The typical design of these houses was of a tall square block of three storeys, set within a courtyard, with thick walls and battlements. For security, no access from the ground floor to the two floors above, could be made. The main hall on the first floor was reached by a removable staircase from the Courtyard and access to the top floor, where the sleeping quarters were located, was by a narrow stair within the walls. Other rooms were also created within the walls. The roofs were made of stone for protection against fire attacks and parapets and fighting platforms were provided around the wall tops.

Murdostoun Bridge
Murdostoun Bridge, dated to 1817, is a single-span segmental-arch bridge constructed predominantly of yellow ashlar sandstone, with chamfered-wing walls, hood moulded arch ring and low ashlar parapets.

Murdostoun Bridge crosses the South Calder Water which divided the Murdostoun Estate from the Allanton estate. The river is also the parish boundary. Equidistant between the Allanton estate village of Bonkle and Murdostoun Castle. The bridge was probably built by the Stewarts of Allanton, stylistically it is similar to the triple span Allanton House bridge. The date of 1817 matches many of the cottages in Bonkle, the Allanton estate village whereas the Murdostoun estate was unoccupied at this time.

History
The Barony of Murdostoun once included the lands of Hartwood and extended east as far as Hilhouserig and Hartwood Burn.

The Murthock Family (1241-1296)
The Family Murthock can be traced back as far as the reign of Alexander III of Scotland.

The Scott Family (1296-1466)
In 1296 Sir Richard Scott married the daughter and heiress of Murdostoun and became the owner of the properties of Murdostoun and Hardwood, and as feudal lord swore fealty to Edward I of England.
Sir Richard died in 1320. His descendant, Sir David Scott, sat in the Parliament held in Edinburgh in 1487 as 'Dominus de Baccleuch.' His son, Sir Michael Scott, heir of Murdostoun, distinguished himself at the Battle of Halidon Hill on 19 July 1333. He was slain at the Battle of Durham, 17 October 1346. He was succeeded by his elder son Robert, who died in 1389, who in turn was succeeded by his son Walter Scott of Murdostoun and Rankelburn. On 7 December 1389, he obtained a charter from Robert II of the superiority of Kirkurd, and was honoured by a knighthood. 
On 23 July 1446 by a charter of Excambion the Scotts' lands of Murdostoun and Hartwood were exchanged with Thomas Inglis for his half of the Barony of Branxholm in Roxburghshire.

The Inglis Family (1466-1719)
Their earliest home was at Branxholm on the River Teviot in Roxburghshire.  Their founder was Sir William Inglis, who at a border foray in 1395 answered the challenge of an English champion, Sir Thomas Struthers, and killed him in single combat. As a reward for his prowess King Robert III made Sir William Inglis, a grant of the barony of Manor, Roxburghshire|Manor, which seems to have included the whole Manor Valley, a glen running south from the River Tweed about three miles west of Peebles, and known to readers of Sir Walter Scott as the scene of The Black Dwarf.

Not long after the affair of Rulehaugh the Inglises seized opportunities of getting rid of Branxholm. On January 31, 1420, John Inglis of Manor, son of Sir William Inglis, granted a charter conveying half of Branxholm to Sir Robert Scott of Murdostoun in Lanarkshire, who already owned an extensive domain in Ettrick Forest and Teviotdale.

Thomas Inglis, John's eldest son, found the frequent incursions of the English cattle raiders a source of annoyance; accordingly he arranged with Sir Walter Scott, Sir Robert's successor, to exchange the rest of Branxholm with the Scott lands in Lanarkshire, and on July 23, 1446, the bargain was embodied in a charter of excambion.

The Scotts settled at Branxholm, which forms part of the Buccleuch estates to this day; while Thomas Inglis removed to Lanarkshire. On his death, Murdostoun went to his eldest son, Thomas, and his heirs, who also held for a time the superiority of Manor. The property of Manor went to John, the second son, but in time it became restricted to Manorhead, a farm at the top of the glen, which remained in the younger branch of the family till 1709, when it was sold.

The Inglis family remained in residence at Murdostoun for the next 300 years. The old stock of Inglises ended with Thomas Inglis of Murdostoun, who succeeded in about 1696, and sold the estate to Alexander Inglis, merchant in Edinburgh, the second son of David Inglis of Fingask, and a descendant of the Inglises of Inglistarvit, Fife.

The death of Alexander Inglis in 1719 signalled the end of the connection of this part of the Inglis family with the Barony of Murdostoun.  Alexander Inglis, having no heirs, bequeathed the Estate to his nephew Alexander Hamilton, with the proviso that he took the Inglis name.

The Inglis-Hamiltons (1719-1850)
Alexander Inglis Hamilton's three sons succeeded in turn. The eldest, Alexander Inglis Hamilton, died on April 27, 1783; the second, Gavin Inglis Hamilton (1730–97), was a historical painter and archaeologist at Rome; the youngest, Major-General James Inglis Hamilton, distinguished himself in the American Revolutionary War, and died on July 27, 1803. He adopted, James Anderson, the son of a sergeant major in Saratoga, New York.

He re-entailed Murdostoun on his adopted son, James Anderson, who took the surname Inglis-Hamilton.  Colonel James Inglis Hamilton, Laird of Murdostoun, died at the Battle of Waterloo in 1815.

The Stewarts (1850-1979)

History of the Stewart family

Stewart trained in accountancy before acquiring his father's iron and coal business at Cleland. The Discovery of a seam of black band ironstone led to considerable wealth.

He joined the Glasgow Town Council in 1842 and took up a series of posts: as river bailie in 1843, ordinary magistrate in 1845 and senior bailie or acting chief magistrate in 1847. He was active, on horseback and in his office, in suppressing civil disturbances in 1848.

His period as Lord Provost, which ended in 1854, coincided with the question of a water supply for Glasgow. He retired from the council at the end of 1855 and died on 12 September 1866. He had married Isabella King in 1852, and she, along with a daughter and two sons, survived him.

Mr Stewart, like several of his predecessors in the office of Lord Provost, was a native of Glasgow. He was born in 1810. His father was a native of Ayrshire, a circumstance which awakened in the breast of his son, while he was still a mere boy, a longing to connect himself with that county by the purchase of an estate as soon as fortune should enable him to do so - a desire, however, which, in as far as Ayrshire was concerned, was not destined to be fulfilled. At a very early age he was placed in the counting house of Mr Dixon of Govanhill, father of the late Mr Dixon of Belleisle, and there he acquired a thorough knowledge of finance and accounts, and also a practical knowledge of the coal and iron businesses. On the death of his father, who for several years had carried on the business of an iron-and-coal master at Omoa on the estate of Cleland, belonging to the family of Stair, Mr Stewart reconstructed the works, and having acquired in lease an extensive mineral field, which was found to contain an excellent seam of black band ironstone, he in the course of a few years acquired a considerable fortune, to which after years of great success were to make great additions. Notwithstanding the claims which his business had upon him, he found that he had sufficient time to devote to municipal affairs, and accordingly he became a member of the Town Council in 1842 as one of the representatives of what was then known as the second ward, the ward in which his own Mansion House of Parson's Green was situated.

In 1843, and when he had been only one year in the Town Council, he was appointed to the office of River Bailie, in immediate succession to the late Mr Alexander Baird, of Gartsherrie fame. In 1845 he was elected as one of the ordinary magistrates; and in 1847 he obtained the office of senior bailie, or acting chief magistrate. In the autumn of that year Mr Hastie, the then Lord Provost, was elected as one of the two representatives of the city in Parliament, one result of which was that he was resident chiefly in London, and another, that the duties which, had he been resident in Glasgow, he would have required to discharge personally, were devolved upon, and had to be performed by Mr Stewart, as acting chief magistrate.

In the early part of 1848 trade was, in consequence of the mercantile depression which began in the course of the previous year, in a wretchedly bad condition, and many of the population were out of employment, and consequently in a state bordering upon starvation. Moreover, a few weeks previously another revolution had overthrown the Government of Louis Philippe; and the whole of Europe was in a state of excitement and discontent. It is not to be wondered at that in such circumstances there was in this populous district a strong tendency to disturbances, and, indeed, disturbances did ensue, not, it is to be added, without some loss of life and also some destruction of property. Of course Mr Stewart had to play a prominent part as the actual head of the magistracy, and that he performed his part well was universally admitted.

When the Colonel of the regiment of cavalry which had been called out to assist in the suppression of the disturbances appeared on the scene with a squadron, Mr Stewart, who by the way was an excellent horseman, mounted the horse of an orderly dragoon, rode with the colonel and his men into the very thick of the fray, and acted with great decision and promptitude; the disturbances were speedily suppressed. Indeed, under a man of less courage, less judgment, and less force of character the loss of life would have been very serious and the injury to property immense, to say nothing of the effect which a successful riot would have had on the working population of all the adjacent mining and manufacturing districts. In 1851, on the expiration of Sir James Anderson's term of office, Mr Stewart was elected as his successor - many of his supporters thus seeking to recognise the very valuable services rendered by him in the trying scenes of 1848.

In 1852 Mr Stewart was married to Miss Isabella King, one of the daughters of a well-known and highly esteemed citizen, the late Mr King of Levernholm Campsie.

Shortly after his elevation to the office of Lord Provost, Mr Stewart applied himself to the important question of a water supply for Glasgow, a task in which he had the valuable support of his esteemed friend the late Bailie James Gourlay, in the memoir of whom will be found a very full and most interesting account of the violent opposition which the scheme encountered. Suffice it to say here that the opposition only tended to increase the perseverance and the energy of Mr Stewart; and ultimately - and, as is well known, to a great extent through the influence which he had with the Prime Minister of the day, Lord Palmerston, of whom two or three years previously he had become a personal friend - the Water Bill was carried, the benefit which it conferred being beyond all question one of the greatest boons ever conferred upon the city. When we think of the obloquy which was heaped upon Mr Stewart, on the virulence with which he was assailed, on the worry to which from first to last he was subjected, and on the weeks, nay the months of anxiety which he had to pass through, all in his endeavours to procure for his fellow citizens a bountiful supply of pure water, we do not feel surprised that his health became affected and that the seeds were laid of the disease which was destined not many years afterwards to terminate a career of so much worth and so much usefulness to the community at large.(1)

In 1856 Mr Stewart acquired from Mr Baillie Cochrane, now Lord Lamington, at a cost of £55,000, the estate of Murdostoun, situated in the parish of Shotts, Lanarkshire, and immediately began to improve it upon an extensive scale and with great taste.(2)

We should mention that, although his provostship terminated in 1854, Mr Stewart remained in the Town Council until the end of 1855, in order that, as Chairman of the Water Scheme, he might give the town the benefit of his services in carrying through the Bill. On retiring from the Council, he ceased to take any interest in municipal affairs; but as a county proprietor he took an active part in all county matters.

Mr Stewart died suddenly, of heart disease, on 12 September 1866, survived by his wife, by a daughter, and by two sons, the elder of whom, Mr Robert King Stewart, B.A., is proprietor of Murdostoun and Langbyres, and the younger, Mr William Lindsay Stewart, is proprietor of the lands of Stanmore, situate in the upper ward of Lanarkshire.

(1) To commemorate Provost Stewart's services to the community, a Memorial Fountain has been erected in the West-End Park at the expense of the City.

(2) This property belonged down to the middle of the 15th century to the Scotts of Buccleuch, and was then exchanged by them for part of the lands of Branxholme in Roxburghshire, belonging to a family of the name of Inglis. In later times Murdostoun belonged to James Inglis Hamilton, who commanded the Scots Greys at Waterloo, and who was killed at the head of his regiment in the somewhat reckless charge which our heavy cavalry made on Marshal Ney's "grand battery." It then passed to Admiral the Hon. Sir Alexander Inglis Cochrane, captor of the Danish West India Islands, and next, in 1832, to his son the late Admiral Sir Thomas Inglis Cochrane, the father of Lord Lamington. This estate Mr Stewart added in 1865 by the purchase of the lands of Langbyres, situate in the vicinity of Murdostoun.

Robert Stewart
Murdostoun Castle was acquired by Robert Stewart (b. 1811), son of Robert Stewart and Mary Herbert of Stair, East Ayrshire, in 1850 from Lord Lamington for £55,000.  Robert Stewart married Isabella King, daughter of John King, about 1852. Robert Stewart died on 12 September 1866. Robert and Isabella had two sons, Robert King Stewart  (b. 1852) and William Lindsay Stewart (b. 1859).

Sir Robert King Stewart, KBE
Robert Stewart was succeeded as Laird of the Murdostoun estate by his elder son, Sir Robert King Stewart, KBE, (b. 1852). The estate was reported to contain 1760 acres in 1873.

Sir Robert married seventeen-year-old Alice Margaret Christie (b. about 1863, d. September 1940), daughter of John (b. July 1822, d. August 1902)  and Alison Philp Christie of Cowden, near Dollar, Clackmannanshire, about 1881. Sir Robert served as the Lord Lieutenant for Lanarkshire from 18 April 1921 until his death on 20 December 1930. Sir Robert was a master mason in Lodge Livingstone St Andrew No. 573. (The younger son, William Lindsay Stewart, became proprietor of Stanmore near Lanark.)

Sir Robert King Stewart and Lady Alice Christie Stewart had three sons:

 Robert Craig Christie Stewart (b. 1882). This son died young.
 Captain John Christie Stewart (b. 1888), Eton, B.A. (Oxon)
 Major Alexander Caldwell (Bey) Stewart, M. C., (b. 1891 or 1892, d. 1927), who served in the Cameronians. Major Stewart made his home at Arndean, Clackmannanshire (now Perth and Kinross). He married Florence Hamilton Lighton (b. 1894), daughter of Sir Christopher Robert Lighton, 7th Bt., in 1923. Major Stewart died suddenly in a nursing home in Edinburgh on 8 February 1927, following an operation. Funeral services were held at Blairingone Church on Friday, February 11. He was survived by his wife, a daughter, and a son, who continued to reside at the Arndean estate.

Mr John Christie, Lady Stewart's father, died in 1902.  Lady Stewart received title to the 3,000-acre Ardean Estate near Blairingone as her portion of the estate.

The Stewarts usually wintered abroad to escape the worst of the Scottish winter.  Murdostoun was the first house in Scotland to receive electric lighting in September 1882.  The electricity was generated by a steam-powered generator. They acquired a motor car in 1908 and the telephone was installed in 1910.

The Stewarts were active in World War I.  John Christie Stewart served as staff captain. Alexander Caldwell Stewart joined the Cameronians. He was wounded at the Battle of Festubert in 1915 for which he received the Military Cross. Alice ran three hospitals. Robert served as convenor of the County Council, director of the Red Cross, and served with the Territorial Army for which he was honoured as a Knight Commander of the Order of the British Empire (KBE). Major Alexander Caldwell Stewart was wounded again and received a bar to the Military Cross. Alice was awarded the Order of the British Empire (OBE) for her work.

Sir Robert King Stewart, KBE, died in December 1930 at the age of 78. Lady Alice then removed to Cleghorn House, about eight miles from Murdostoun, in what is now South Lanarkshire to allow her son to have full use of Murdostoun Castle.

Lady Alice Christie King Stewart, O.B.E., J. P., died at Cleghorn House on September 5, 1940 after catching a chill in her garden. The Glasgow Herald wrote:
<blockquote>
"Among her many activities the following may be mentioned. She was vice-president of the Council for Scotland of the Queen's Institute of District Nursing; honorary president of the Glasgow District Nursing association; president of the Lanarkshire branch of the British Red Cross society; president of the Lanarkshire Girl Guides; county organiser of the Scotland's Garden scheme and vice-president of the Franco-Scottish society. </p>

...
<p>
"In the Girl Guide movement she was a pioneer, and was actively concerned  with the origin and growth of the movement. During the last war, she was the commandant of the Hartwood Hill Red Cross Hospital."
</blockquote>

Captain John Christie Stewart, CBE
Sir Robert's son, Captain John Christie Stewart, CBE, succeeded him as laird of Murdostoun.

Captain Stewart married Agnes Violet Averil (Ava) Douglas (b. 1901), daughter of Brigadier General Douglas Campbell and Violet Averil Margaret Vivian and granddaughter of the first Baron Swansea, in Holy Trinity Church, Brompton, London on Saturday afternoon, February 18, 1928. Boy Scouts from the bridegroom's company in Lanarkshire and Girl Guides from the bride's company in Dumbartonshire came to London for the wedding and formed a guard of honour. Mr Stewart had Mr Jack Lockhart as best man. Canon F. Stewart of Sketry, Glamorgan; Rev. Doctor Archibald Fleming of St Columba's Church of Scotland; and Prebendary Gough of Holy Trinity were officiating clergy. A reception was held the previous day in the home of the Hon. Mrs Merry at 18 Hill Street, Berkeley Square.

Captain Stewart served as Chairman of the Executive Committee of the Scottish Branch of the  British Red Cross Society.

Captain Stewart was invested as Commander of the Order of the British Empire on June 12, 1947.

Captain Stewart served as Lord Lieutenant for Lanarkshire from  16 June 1959 until the expiration of his term on 19 August 1963. Captain Stewart was a master mason in Lodge Livingston St Andrews.no. 573. He was also an avid hunter.

Sir Robert King Stewart and his son, Captain John Christie Stewart each served as Grand Master Mason of the Grand Lodge of Scotland, the latter serving from 1942 to 1945.

The Stewarts were related to the famous Victorian lady traveller and author, Miss Isabella (Ella) Robertson Christie (b. 1861, d. 1949), sister of Lady Alice Margaret Christie Stewart (b. about 1863, d. September 1940), and to the family of John Hill of Homestead Plantation, West Baton Rouge Parish, Louisiana, whose mother, Isabella Christie (sister to Alexander Christie of Milnwood, Lanarkshire), married George Hill (b. 1785, d. 1852) of Old Monkland, Lanarkshire, where he had an ironworks.

Lady Stewart and her sister, Miss Ella Christie of Cowden Castle (near Muckhart), published a reminiscence of their lives entitled A Long Look at Life, by Two Victorians in 1940.

Mrs Averil Stewart published a book of poetry, Mercury in the Garden, in 1946. Mrs Stewart also wrote a memoir of her mother-in-law, Lady Alice Christie King Stewart, and the sister of the mother-in-law, Miss Ella Christie, entitled Alicella, which was published in 1955 by John Murray of London.

The Stewarts remodelled Murdostoun Castle into a very comfortable residence. They were fond of their dogs and created a pet cemetery in which their dogs were buried.

Mrs Averil Stewart died in April 1975 and Captain John Stewart died in May 1978. They are interred in a family mausoleum in Cambusnethan Church cemetery in Cambusnethan, a large suburb on the eastern side of Wishaw.

Captain and Mrs Stewart had no children. After their deaths, the Murdostoun estate passed to a great-nephew and the property was sold in 1979.

The National Library of Scotland has an inventory of family papers from Murdostoun Castle, which are stored in boxes at the library.

Murdostoun Castle today
Murdostoun Castle was recently used as an alcohol-related brain damage care unit. The Frank Jamieson wing was a modern purpose-built facility, providing nursing and social care in a selection of differing rooms for single occupancy. As well as bright airy rooms, a large conservatory and enclosed-garden area are available. The two care facilities closed down for refurbishment in 2010 leaving just the 20-bed brain injury rehabilitation centre.
Recent refurbishment by the Huntercombe Group saw the newer buildings on the site managed as rehabilitation and care centres from a variety of neurological conditions while the castle is home to the Abbeycare Foundation, a private addiction centre.

See also
 Murdostoun (ward)
 South Calder Water
 Wishaw

Further reading
 Smith, John Guthrie and Mitchell, John Oswald. Old Country Houses of the Old Glasgow Gentry, Second Edition. Glasgow: James MacLehose & Sons, 1878.
 MacLehose, James. Memoirs and Portraits of 100 Glasgow Men. Glasgow: James MacLehose and Sons, 1886.
  Christie, Ella & Stewart, Alice Christie King. A Long Look at Life, by Two Victorians. Seeley, Service & Co. Ltd., 1940.
 Stewart, Averil. Alicella. London: John Murray, 1955.

References

External links
 Murdostoun Castle & Salsburgh Heritage Group
 The Inglis of Murdostoun
 Abbeycare Rehab in Murdostoun
 History of the Lands of Murdostoun

Geography of North Lanarkshire
Wishaw
Castles in North Lanarkshire